Antonio Pasini (21 February 1770  – 23 July 1845) was an Italian painter and manuscript illuminator.

He trained under Domenico Muzzi in Parma. In 1805, he was nominated as Professor of Miniatura for the Accademia di Belle Arti of Parma. In 1816, he became portraitist for the local court. In 1822, he was named Teacher of Composizione e di Anatomia in Parma. He was adept at painting miniature portraits on ivory.
 
Among his pupils were Francesco Scaramuzza, Macedonio Melloni, Evangelista Pinelli and Vincenzo Bertolotti.

References

1770 births
1845 deaths
19th-century Italian painters
Italian male painters
20th-century Italian painters
Painters from Parma
19th-century Italian male artists
20th-century Italian male artists